Haji Riyanto or better known as Tukul Arwana (born 16 October 1963) is an Indonesian actor, comedian and presenter of Javanese descent.

Early life
Tukul was born in Semarang, Central Java. When he was young, he often appeared on stage during the celebrations of Indonesia's Independence Day. He once worked as a driver. A friend, Joko Dewo, persuaded him to move to Jakarta, and initially supported him financially. Tukul then married a Padangese woman named Susi Similikiti Weleh Weleh, with whom he had a daughter.

Career
Tukul began working on the radio, where he met other Indonesian comedians. The turning point in his career was when he starred with child star Joshua in a music video. He then moved to television and hosted programs for TPI and Indosiar. He is now best known for the chatshow Empat Mata.

Empat Mata
At the beginning of November 2008, Empat Mata was banned by the Indonesian Broadcasting Commission (KPI) following a fourth breach of the commission's guidelines. The show subsequently resumed under the name Bukan Empat Mata, "bukan" being the Indonesian word for "not".

References

External links

1963 births
Living people
20th-century comedians
21st-century comedians
Indonesian Muslims
Indonesian male comedians
Indonesian comedians
Indonesian television presenters
Javanese people
People from Semarang